Gangor is a 2010 multilingual, Independent film directed by Italo Spinelli. The Italian production is based on a Bangla short story "Choli Ke Peeche" (Behind the Bodice) by Mahasweta Devi. The film was shot in West Bengal in India with dialogues in Bengali, Santhali and English. The film was later dubbed into Italian. At the 5th Rome Film Festival where the cast of the film got a standing ovation at the film's screening.

The film won the Best Film, Best Director, Best Actor and Best Actress awards at the New Jersey Independent South Asian Film Festival. The film won the NETPAC Jury award at the 10th Third Eye Asian Film Festival 2011. The film won the top award named after Filipino director Lino Brocka at the 13th Cinemanila International Film Festival in Philippines.

Plot
Upin, a veteran photo-journalist comes to Purulia in West Bengal to report on the violence against the poor tribal women in the impoverished region. There he comes across Gangor breast-feeding her child. He photographs her using one of the pictures for his news report. The picture triggers a backlash as she is shunned by the villagers. The policemen take her forcibly to the police station and gang rape her. In the meantime, Upin realizes his folly and haunted by the hushed-up violence travels back to Purulia to look for her. Gangor is no longer there and no one has her whereabouts. Determined to find her out Upin presses on his search and one night meets her, who has now become a prostitute. Gangor asks him to photograph her again taking off her blouse to reveals how her body was mutilated by the policemen during gang-rape. Upin runs away from her falling on the railway track and comes under the wheels of train. As the incident comes to the attention media, Gangor’s case reaches court. On the day of the hearing of her case, a group of tribal women led by activist Medha take off their blouses on the court premises to mark their protest against the police brutality.

Cast
Priyanka Bose as Gangor 
Adil Hussain as Upin 
Samrat Chakrabarti as Ujan 
Tillotama Shome as Medha 
Seema Rahmani as Shital 
Paoli Dam
Vikas Shrivastav as Daroga
Ashok Kumar Beniwal as Police Inspector

References

External links

Italian independent films
Works by Italian people
Films based on works by Mahasweta Devi
Films based on short fiction
Bengali-language Indian films